William Edwin (Ted) Chapman (16 December 1934 – 25 July 2005) was a Liberal member of the Parliament of South Australia from 10 March 1973 to 11 March 1992 and Minister.

Chapman represented the district of Alexandra in the South Australian House of Assembly between 1973 and 1992. He served as Minister for Agriculture when David Tonkin was premier, taking a lead in promoting Australian dry-land farming in the Middle East.

Chapman died in hospital in July 2005 after incurring a brain hemorrhage two months earlier.

Ministerial appointments
18 Sep 1979 – 10 Nov 1982 Minister of Agriculture.
18 Sep 1979 – 10 Nov 1982 Minister of Forests.

Family
His daughter, Vickie Chapman, has served as a state Liberal parliamentarian since the 2002 election, as deputy Liberal leader from 2006 to 2009, and again since 2013, and as deputy premier of South Australia. She lost both positions in November 2021 when she resigned the Deputy Leadership, and thus deputy premier.

References

Liberal Party of Australia members of the Parliament of South Australia
1934 births
2005 deaths
Members of the South Australian House of Assembly
Liberal and Country League politicians
20th-century Australian politicians
People from Kangaroo Island, South Australia